Usman Zaki Dan Dendo (1790–1859) was the first Etsu Nupe, the traditional ruler of the Nupe Kingdom.

History 
Usman Zaki was the first son of Islamic preacher Malam Dendo, a Fulani man from Gwandu who was sent from Sokoto, Nigeria to introduce Islam into the Nupe Kingdom. The name "Usman Zaki" is renowned for being the first ruling household of Bida Emirate. He was the first emir in Bida to become Etsu Nupe ("King of Nupe"). He introduced this title in 1856, during his second term as emir, defeating his rival Malam Umar Bahaushe, a Fulani man. The title was proclaimed during the civil war of Nupe in 1847, which lasted until 1856.

Usman Zaki reigned for less than four years. During his reign, he resided at the military camp in the Bini area. It was during his reign that the city of Bida was renamed and made the capital.

He died in 1859 and was succeeded by Ma'a Saba the Second, who reigned for four years, and then by Majigi the Third, who reigned from 1884 until his death in 1895.

References

Further reading 

 The colonial contest for Nigeria region. German participation history,  Lit V. Münster, 1900
 The Sokoto Caliphate; History economy and the society. Arewa House, Kaduna, Mashoid. Y, 1999–2020
 The Trans-African journal of History. African publication, 1996
 The Nupe people and their Creed. German linguistic studies, Sir Nigfried, 1956
 The African traditions and culture. West African publication, 1990.
 Meet the royal Ndayako's, house-hold name in the northern Nigerian kingdoms. Media Trust, 2018

19th-century monarchs in Africa
1790 births
1859 deaths
19th-century Nigerian people
Emirs of Bida
Etsu Nupe
Nigerian Muslims
Nigerian Fula people